Afrikansk FC is a Swedish football club located in Södertälje.

Background
Afrikansk FC currently plays in Division4 Södermanland which is the sixth tier of Swedish football league system.

Footnotes

External links
 Afrikanskfc – Website
 Afrikansk FC on Facebook

Football clubs in Stockholm County
Diaspora football clubs in Sweden
Sport in Södertälje